Kathleen Crowley (born Betty Jane Crowley; December 26, 1929 – April 23, 2017) was an American actress. She appeared more than 100 times in movies and television series in the 1950s and 1960s, almost always as a leading lady.

Biography

Early life
Born on December 26, 1929, in the Green Bank section of Washington Township, New Jersey, Crowley graduated from Egg Harbor City High School in 1946. On August 7, 1949, the 19-year-old Crowley won the title of Miss New Jersey at a contest held at Asbury Park, New Jersey. As the winner, she entered the Miss America pageant held in Atlantic City, New Jersey on September 10, 1949, and finished in seventh place. At the time, she was working as a bookkeeper.

Acting career
Crowley attended New York's American Academy of Dramatic Arts in 1950 on a scholarship won at the Miss America pageant, and undertook some live TV work there.

In February 1951, she appeared with Conrad Nagel in A Star Is Born on Robert Montgomery Presents. Crowley made 81 television appearances and was cast in 20 movies between 1951 and 1970. One of her last movie roles was in Downhill Racer with Robert Redford. She made three guest appearances on Perry Mason, including the role of defendant and title character Marylin Clark in the 1958 episode "The Case of the Lonely Heiress."  She was in the 1963 episode of Perry Mason's "The Case of the Drowsy Mosquito" as Mrs. Bradisson.

Her most frequent recurring appearance was as Terry Van Buren in seventeen episodes of Waterfront. She also appeared in seven episodes of the popular TV Series 77 Sunset Strip (1958-1964) beginning with that series’ episode titled “Lovely Lady Pity Me,” based on a novel by series creator Roy Huggins. In the episode "Strange Bedfellows," she appeared as Martizza Vedar, a character purposely similar to Zsa Zsa Gabor due to their extremely close physical resemblance. For the episode "The Desert Spa Caper," Crowley portrayed alcoholic actress Claire Dickens.
In 1966 Crowley portrayed Sophia Starr on two episodes of the TV series "Batman," entitled "The Penguin Goes Straight" and "Not Yet He Aint."

Many of her films were science fiction and horror movies, but she appeared in a wide range of narrative television series produced from the mid-1950s to the late 1960s, including Crossroads, Yancy Derringer with Jock Mahoney, Bourbon Street Beat with Andrew Duggan, Surfside 6 with Troy Donahue, Hawaiian Eye with Connie Stevens, 77 Sunset Strip with Efrem Zimbalist Jr., Bat Masterson with Gene Barry, Cheyenne with Clint Walker, an anthology series Fireside Theater, another anthology series The Americans, Bonanza in the first season chapter 28, Colt .45, Bronco with Ty Hardin, Branded with Chuck Connors, Climax!, My Three Sons with Fred MacMurray, The Donna Reed Show, Checkmate with Sebastian Cabot and Doug McClure, Route 66, Thriller with Boris Karloff, Batman with Adam West, Disneyland, Family Affair with Brian Keith, Rawhide with Clint Eastwood, The Virginian with Doug McClure, The High Chaparral, The Restless Gun with John Payne, Tales of Wells Fargo with Dale Robertson, The Lone Ranger, and The Adventures of Champion. In 1960, Crowley appeared as Laurie Allen on the TV western Laramie in the episode titled "Street of Hate."

Crowley is best remembered for appearing in eight episodes, a series record for leading ladies, as a variety of seductive sirens on the series Maverick (1957-1962). She was the only actress in the series whom James Garner lauded for her acting ability in depth and at length in his memoir The Garner Files.  Her Maverick episodes were "The Jeweled Gun" with Jack Kelly, "Maverick Springs" with James Garner and Jack Kelly, "The Misfortune Teller" with James Garner, "A Bullet for the Teacher" and "Kiz" with Roger Moore, and three more with Jack Kelly titled "Dade City Dodge," "The Troubled Heir," and "One of Our Trains is Missing."

Private life
Crowley married John Rubsam in Los Angeles on September 27, 1969, and gave birth to her only child, a son named Matthew, the following year.

Death
She died at age 87 on April 23, 2017, at her home in Green Bank, New Jersey. She was survived by her husband, son and a granddaughter.

Selected filmography

The Silver Whip (1953)
The Farmer Takes a Wife (1953)
Target Earth (1954)
City of Shadows (1955)
Westward Ho the Wagons! (1956)
Female Jungle (1956)
The Quiet Gun (1957)
The Phantom Stagecoach (1957)
Wagon Train ('The Mark Hanford Story') (1958)
The Restless Gun (1958) Episode "Woman From Sacramento"
The Flame Barrier (1958)
The Rebel Set (1959)
Curse of the Undead (1959)
FBI Code 98 (1962)
Showdown (1963)
Downhill Racer (1969)
The Lawyer (1970)

References

External links

 
 

1929 births
2017 deaths
Miss America 1940s delegates
Actresses from New Jersey
American film actresses
American television actresses
People from Washington Township, Burlington County, New Jersey
People from Egg Harbor City, New Jersey
Western (genre) television actors
Western (genre) film actresses
20th-century American actresses
21st-century American women